Viktor Mikhailovich Chernov (December 7, 1873 – April 15, 1952) was a Russian revolutionary and one of the founders of the Russian Socialist-Revolutionary Party. He was the primary party theoretician or the 'brain' of the party, and was more of an analyst than a political leader. Following the February Revolution of 1917, Chernov was Minister for Agriculture in the Russian Provisional Government and advocating immediate land reform. Later on, he was Chairman of the Russian Constituent Assembly.

Biography

Early years 
Viktor Chernov was born in Novouzensk, a town southeast of Saratov in Samara guberniya. He was the son of a former serf peasant who had risen to become a low-level functionary in the local civil service.

Chernov attended gymnasium in Saratov, a hotbed of radicalism, where he joined a populist discussion circle in which he studied the works of Nikolay Dobrolyubov and Nikolay Mikhaylovsky. His radical proclivities attracted the attention of the local police and Chernov transferred to school in Iurev for his final year of study.

Chernov enrolled in the Law department of Moscow University, where he once again joined a radical discussion circle, defending populist views against Marxists. He was arrested for his political activities in the spring of 1894 and spent 9 months in Peter and Paul Fortress in St. Petersburg. Following his incarceration, Chernov was sentenced to a period of administrative exile in central Russia.

Political career 
By the end of the 1880s, he was involved in revolutionary activity. He attended the law faculty of Moscow University and in the early 1890s joined the Narodniks; in 1894, he joined Mark Natanson's "People's Right" (Narodnoe pravo) group, an attempt to unite all the socialist movements in Russia, and with other members was arrested, jailed, and exiled. After marrying Anastasia Sletova in 1898 and spending some time organizing the peasants around Tambov, he went abroad to Zurich in 1899. He joined the Socialist-Revolutionary Party upon its founding in 1901 and became the editor of its newspaper Revolutionary Russia. He returned to Russia after the Revolution of 1905; after boycotting the elections for the First Duma, he won election to the Second Duma and became a leader of the SR faction.

In 1907, he published Philosophical and Sociological Studies in which he espoused the viewpoint of Richard Avenarius. As such, he was one of the Russian Machists criticised by Lenin in Materialism and Empirio-criticism (1909).

Under Alexander Kerensky's provisional government in 1917, Chernov was the Minister for Agriculture. On 17 March the Provisional Government issued its first appeal to the peasant population. It stated that the land question must be solved not by force but by legislation to be passed by the people's representatives. In summer the Stolypin land-tenure laws were suspended. Chernov resigned shortly after the departure of Prince Lvov. Then on 9 August the elections were postponed until 12 November. Chernov continued his campaign for immediate agrarian reform. The Union of Landowners saw in Chernov its principal enemy. Chernov and his wife were both elected to the Assembly from Tambov. In January 1918 he was Chairman of the Russian Constituent Assembly, which was dissolved by the Bolsheviks shortly after it began meeting. He became a member of an anti-Bolshevik government leading the more moderate Social Revolutionaries in Samara, before fleeing to Europe and then in 1941 to the United States. There he continued to publish his periodical 'Za svobodu' (For Liberty).

Chernov died in New York City in 1952.

See also
Socialist League of the New East

Sources 

Alexander Trapeznik, 'The Revolutionary Career of Viktor Mikhailovich Chernov (1873-1952)', M.A. thesis, University of Tasmania, 1988

Notes

Footnotes

External links
Victor Chernov website 
Victor Chernov, 'Bolshevik Romance and Reality,' Foreign Affairs, January 1927
Victor Chernov, 'The Soviet Government and the Communist Party,' Foreign Affairs, January 1929
Victor Chernov, 'Russia's Two Parties,' Foreign Affairs, October 1930.

1873 births
1952 deaths
American people of Russian descent
Asian democratic socialists
European democratic socialists
Members of the Executive of the Labour and Socialist International
Ministers of the Russian Provisional Government
Narodniks
People of the Russian Revolution
Russian anti-communists
Russian Constituent Assembly members
Revolutionaries from the Russian Empire
Russian socialists
Socialist Revolutionary Party politicians
Trudoviks
White Russian emigrants to the United States